From August 28, 2011 to March 18, 2012, the following skiing events took place at various locations around the world.

Alpine skiing
October 22, 2011 – March 18, 2012: 2012 Alpine Skiing World Cup

Biathlon
 November 28 – March 18 : 2011–12 Biathlon World Cup
 March 1 – March 11 : Biathlon World Championships 2012

Freestyle skiing
 December 10 – March 18 : 2011–12 FIS Freestyle Skiing World Cup

Nordic skiing
 November 25, 2011 – March 10, 2012: 2011–12 FIS Nordic Combined World Cup
 November 27, 2011 – March 18, 2012: 2011–12 FIS Ski Jumping World Cup
 November 19, 2011 – March 18, 2012: 2011–12 FIS Cross-Country World Cup
 December 29 – January 8: 2011–12 Tour de Ski
 Dario Cologna of Switzerland for the men and Poland's Justyna Kowalczyk won the tournament for the third time.
 December 29 – January 6: 2011–12 Four Hills Tournament
  Gregor Schlierenzauer won the tournament for the first time in Bischofshofen, Austria

Ski mountaineering
 February 4, 2012 – February 10, 2012: 2012 European Championship of Ski Mountaineering held in Pelvoux/Massif des Écrins, France

Snowboarding
 August 28, 2011 and ended on March 17, 2012: 2011–12 FIS Snowboard World Cup

References

External links

 International Ski Federation official website
 IPC Alpine Skiing official website
 International Biathlon Union official website
 IPC Biathlon and Cross Country Skiing official website

Skiing by year
Skiing
Skiing